The U.S. state of California is divided into 58 counties. The state was first divided into 27 counties on February 18, 1850. These were further sub-divided to form sixteen additional counties by 1860. Another fourteen counties were formed through further subdivision from 1861 to 1893.  The most recent county to form was Imperial County, in 1907.

California is home to San Bernardino County, the largest county in the contiguous United States, as well as Los Angeles County, the most populous county in the United States.

California counties are general law counties by default, but may be chartered as provided in Article XI, Section 3 of the California Constitution. A charter county is granted limited home rule powers. Of the 58 counties in California, 14 are governed under a charter. They are Alameda, Butte, El Dorado, Fresno, Los Angeles, Orange, Placer, Sacramento, San Bernardino, San Diego, San Francisco, San Mateo, Santa Clara, and Tehama.

Nine counties in California are named for saints, tied with Louisiana for the largest number. This count omits Santa Cruz ("Holy Cross") County (not named for a saint), Merced County and Los Angeles County, both of whose names refer to Saint Mary, (i.e. Our Lady of Mercy (Merced) and Our Lady Queen of The Angels (Los Angeles)), and Ventura County, whose name is a shortening of the name of St. Bonaventure, the namesake of the local mission.

List 

|}

Defunct counties 
 Branciforte County was the original name of Santa Cruz County in 1850. The reference was to the 1797 town of Branciforte. 
 Klamath County was created in 1851 from the northern half of Trinity County. Part of the county's territory went to Del Norte County in 1857, and in 1874 the remainder was divided between Humboldt and Siskiyou counties.
 Pautah County, California was created in 1852 out of territory which, the state of California assumed, was to be ceded to it by the United States Congress from territory in what is now the state of Nevada. When the cession never occurred, the California State Legislature officially abolished the never-organized county in 1859.
 Buena Vista County was created in 1855 by the California State Legislature out of the southeastern territory of Tulare County on the west of the Sierra Nevada but was never officially organized. The south of Tulare County was later organized as Kern County in 1866, with additions from Los Angeles and San Bernardino counties.
 Coso County was created in 1864 by the California State Legislature out of territory of Mono County and Tulare County on the east slope of the Sierra Nevada but was never officially organized. The region was later organized in 1866 as Inyo County with additions from Los Angeles and San Bernardino counties.
 Roop County, Nevada encompassed much of Lassen County, including the Honey Lake Valley and the community of Susanville, California; ambiguous organic legislation of Nevada Territory led to confusion about the geographic extent of Nevada's western border. This was later clarified, with the portions of Roop County in California being assigned to Lassen County; the remaining, sparsely portions of Roop County were eventually combined with Washoe County, Nevada.

References

External links
 California State Association of Counties
 State map showing the county names and linking to county data
 California State Association of Counties- The Creation of Our 58 Counties, with Maps of the 58 Counties Each Decade ca.1850–1900
 California State Association of Counties,  Map of California Counties: c. 1907–Present

 
Counties
California, counties in